Presbyterorum ordinis, subtitled the "Decree on the Ministry and Life of Priests", is one of the documents produced by the Second Vatican Council. On 7 December 1965, the document was promulgated by Pope Paul VI, after an approval vote of 2,390 to 4 among the assembled bishops. The title means "Order of Priests" in Latin. As is customary for such documents in the Catholic Church, it is taken from the first line of the decree (its incipit).

History
Agitation among the Council Fathers for a separate and distinct conciliar decree on the priesthood began in the second session of the council (1963), in the course of the discussions about the drafts concerning the Dogmatic Constitution on the Church (Lumen gentium). Presbyterorum ordinis has come to be one of the defining documents on the role and duties of the priesthood in the modern era.

Reception
The period that followed the promulgation of Presbyterorum ordinis was marked by a severe drop in the number of priestly vocations in the Western World. Church leaders argued age-old secularization was to blame and that it was not directly related to the documents of the council. Historians also pointed to the damage caused in 1968, by the sexual revolution, and the strong backlash over Humanae vitae. Yet, other authors asserted the drop in vocations was at least partly deliberate as part of an attempt to de-clericalize the Church and allow for a more pluralistic clergy. In 1995, according to the Congregation for the Clergy, in recent years, "despite various persistent difficulties, there is a positive quantitative and qualitative recovery which makes one hope for a priestly second spring." 

There was a related exodus from the priesthood, which began under Paul VI and continued during the papacy of John Paul II. In 2007, "La Civilta Cattolica" reported 69,063 priests left the ministry between 1964 and 2004; 11,213 later returned.

In November 2015 Pope Francis addressed a conference sponsored by the Congregation for the Clergy marking the fiftieth anniversary of the proclamation of the Vatican II decree Presbyterorum ordinis. He told delegates attending the conference, "The good that priests can do comes primarily from their proximity to – and a tender love for – their people. They are not philanthropists or functionaries, but fathers and brothers. ...Even priests have a biography, and are not 'mushrooms' which sprout up suddenly at the Cathedral on their day of ordination."

See also

 Pastores dabo vobis

References

External links
 Full text in Englishat the Vatican website.

1965 documents
1965 in Christianity
Documents of the Second Vatican Council
Catholic priesthood